First National Bank, now known a US Bank, is located in Boone, Iowa, United States. The bank was established in 1884, and their building at this location was destroyed in a fire in 1914. The eight-story bank and office building that replaced it is the work of the Des Moines architectural firm of Proudfoot, Bird & Rawson. T.C. Wardell from Chicago was hired as superintendent of construction because he was considered a specialist in constructing fire-proof buildings. Construction began in 1915, and the building was completed in 1916 for $115,000.

The architecture combines the styling of the Neoclassical style with the form and construction technology of the Chicago Commercial School. The bank was acquired by Citizen's National Bank in 1935, and the building changed names at that time. In the late 1970s a two-story addition was built onto the east side of the original building. A beltcourse of brown aggregate material replaced the original beltcourse at the top of the base to visually tie the two structures together. The building was listed on the National Register of Historic Places in 1989. The bank has subsequently been acquired by US Bank, and the building now uses their name.

References

Office buildings completed in 1916
Boone, Iowa
Neoclassical architecture in Iowa
Bank buildings on the National Register of Historic Places in Iowa
Office buildings on the National Register of Historic Places in Iowa
National Register of Historic Places in Boone County, Iowa
Buildings and structures in Boone County, Iowa
Chicago school architecture in Iowa